Rhaphiodon echinus is a species of flowering plant in the family Lamiaceae, endemic to eastern Brazil. It is the only known species in the genus Rhaphiodon, first described as a plant genus in 1844.

References

Lamiaceae
Endemic flora of Brazil
Plants described in 1823